The 1934 United States Senate election in Minnesota took place on November 6, 1934. Incumbent Farmer–Labor U.S. Senator Henrik Shipstead defeated former State Senator Nathaniel J. Holmberg of the Republican Party of Minnesota and U.S. Representative Einar Hoidale of the Minnesota Democratic Party to win a third term.

Democratic primary

Candidates

Declared
 Einar Hoidale, U.S. Representative since 1933, Minneapolis attorney, former state Commissioner of Agriculture, Dairy and Food, former prosecuting attorney of Brown County (1900-1906), former judge advocate of the state militia (1900-1908), Democratic candidate for Minnesota's 5th Congressional District in 1910 and 1912, Democratic nominee for the 5th CD in 1929, Democratic nominee for the U.S. Senate in 1930
 Lewis Lohmann, St. Paul attorney, former state American Legion commander

Results

Farmer–Labor primary

Candidates

Declared
 Henrik Shipstead, Incumbent U.S. Senator since 1923
 Francis H. Shoemaker, U.S. Representative since 1933, independent candidate for Minnesota's 8th Congressional District in 1934, resident of Red Wing, former newspaper editor and publisher

Results

Republican primary

Candidates

Declared
 Tom Davis, Minneapolis attorney, former publisher, former Marshall County Attorney, former Mayor of Marshall (1910-1913), former state Representative from the 13th House District (1917-1919), Farmer-Labor nominee for Attorney General in 1918, Farmer-Labor candidate for Governor in 1924 and 1926
 N. J. Holmberg, Former State Senator from the 23rd District (1915-1919) and State Representative from the 22nd House District (1907-1915), farmer from Renville, former state Commissioner of Agriculture (1919-1931), candidate for Governor in 1930, nominee for an at-large U.S. House seat in 1932

Results

General election

Candidates

Communist 

 Alfred Tiala, resident of Waterville, national secretary of the United Farmers' League, nominated by petition

Socialist 

 Morris Kaplan, businessman from Bemidji, former Mayor of Bemidji, Public Ownership nominee for Minnesota's 8th Congressional District in 1912, nominated by petition

Results

See also 
 United States Senate elections, 1934

References

Minnesota
1934
1934 Minnesota elections